The 12459 / 60 New Delhi Amritsar Express is a Superfast Express train belonging to Indian Railways - Northern Railway zone that runs between New Delhi and Amritsar Junction in India.

It operates as train number 12459 from New Delhi to Amritsar Junction and as train number 12460 in the reverse direction serving the states of Delhi, Haryana & Punjab.

Coaches

The 12459 / 60 New Delhi Amritsar Express has 2 AC Car, 13 Second Class seating, 3 General Unreserved & 2 SLR (Seating cum Luggage Rake) Coaches. It does not carry a Pantry car coach.

As is customary with most train services in India, Coach Composition may be amended at the discretion of Indian Railways depending on demand.

Service

As the average speed of the train is above , as per Indian Railways rules, its fare includes a Superfast surcharge.

Routeing

The 12459 / 60 New Delhi Amritsar Express runs from New Delhi via Ambala Cant Junction, Ludhiana Junction, Jalandhar City to Amritsar Junction.

Traction

As the route is fully electrified, a Ghaziabad based WAP 4 or WAP 5 locomotive powers the train for its entire journey.

Timings

12459 New Delhi Amritsar Express leaves New Delhi on a daily basis at 13:30 hrs IST and reaches Amritsar Junction at 21:45 hrs IST the same day.

12460 Amritsar New Delhi Express leaves Amritsar Junction on a daily basis at 06:15 hrs IST and reaches New Delhi at 14:15 hrs IST the same day.

References 

 https://www.youtube.com/watch?v=M97uQ-8nSUk
 https://www.youtube.com/watch?v=OuiPqEaAQNc
 https://www.flickr.com/photos/50628848@N07/6301846029/
 http://www.railnews.co.in/railway-traffic-disrupted-on-ludhiana-phillaur-section/

External links

Transport in Amritsar
Transport in Delhi
Rail transport in Delhi
Rail transport in Haryana
Rail transport in Punjab, India
Intercity Express (Indian Railways) trains